The East Berlin District Committee of the Socialist Unity Party of Germany, was the position of highest authority in the district of East Berlin, having more power than the Mayor of East Berlin. The position was created on April 21, 1946 and abolished in 1989, following the fall of the Berlin Wall. The First Secretary was a de facto appointed position usually by the Politburo or the General Secretary himself.

First Secretaries

See also
History of Berlin
East Berlin
Governing Mayor of Berlin
Leadership of East Germany

Sources

East Berlin
Socialist Unity Party of Germany
Politics of East Germany
Lists of political office-holders in Germany
East Germany politics-related lists